The dusky-billed parrotlet (Forpus modestus), also known as Sclater's parrotlet, is a small species of parrot in the family Psittacidae. It is the nominate species (F. m. modestus).

There is one subspecies: Forpus modestus sclateri.

Subspecies

Distribution and habitat 
The dusky-billed parrotlet is found in the Amazon Rainforest in South America, where it is locally fairly common; it also occurs in the Andes and the Amazonian foothills, the Amazon River outlet, and Marajo Island.

Dusky-billed parrotlets prefer lowland tropical rainforest edges and clearings, riparian zones, secondary habitats, and savanna. They seem to favor seasonally-flooding forests.

Conservation 
According to the IUCN Red List, dusky-billed parrotlets are a species of Least Concern. Their population size is unknown, but is believed to be stable.

Threats 
Unlike many members of the genus Forpus, they are not captured for the parrot trade, and they are relatively unaffected by deforestation. There are many protected areas throughout their range.

Behavior

Social 
Dusky-billed parrotlets are usually found in flocks of up to 100 birds outside of their breeding season; otherwise, they are seen mostly in pairs. They are very social, and conspicuous in their habitat. Calls are high-pitched notes or soft wheezing sounds, made while in flight or perched.

Reproduction 
Dusky-billed parrotlets typically breed during July. Clutch size is unknown, but eggs are small, white, and roughly spherical. They nest in tree cavities or similar structures.

Diet 
Dusky-billed parrotlets' diet consists of approximately 10% seeds, buds, and blossoms and 90% berries and fruits,. Grass is occasionally eaten as well. Dusky-billed parrotlets have also been observed to eat clay as a primary source of minerals.

Taxonomy 
The dusky-billed parrotlet was previously described by the name Forpus sclateri by Jean Cabanis in 1849 but later reassigned to the genus Psittacula as Psittacula modesta by George Robert Gray in 1859. However, because the name modesta was assigned to at least two closely related birds of the genus Psittacula, the dusky-billed parrotlet was reverted to F. sclateri. As of 2006, the binomial name for the dusky-billed parrotlet is Forpus modestus, with F. m. sclateri as a subspecies.

It has been suggested that the dusky-billed parrotlet is basal to all other species of the genus Forpus based on diversification and speciation rates and patterns.

Aviculture
The dusky-billed parrotlet is not commonly available in aviculture. It is not commercially available in the U.S. and is very uncommon in Europe.

References

External links

World Parrot Trust Parrot Encyclopedia: species profile
Neotropical Birds by Cornell Lab of Ornithology: species profile
eBird by Cornell Lab of Ornithology: species profile

dusky-billed parrotlet
Birds of the Amazon Basin
Birds of the Colombian Amazon
Birds of the Ecuadorian Amazon
Birds of the Peruvian Amazon
Birds of Bolivia
Birds of Venezuela
Birds of the Guianas
dusky-billed parrotlet
Birds of Brazil
Taxonomy articles created by Polbot